The 2022 WTA Lyon Open (also known as the Open 6ème Sens — Métropole de Lyon for sponsorship reasons) was a women's tennis tournament played on indoor hard courts. It was the third edition of the Lyon Open (WTA) and an International tournament on the 2022 WTA Tour. It took place at the Palais des Sports de Gerland in Lyon, France, from February 28th to March 6th, 2022. During this tournament, the WTA and other international governing bodies of tennis including the ATP did not have players of Russia and Belarus compete under their country's flags as a result of the Russian invasion of Ukraine.

Champions

Singles 

  Zhang Shuai def.  Dayana Yastremska 3–6, 6–3, 6–4

This is Zhang's first WTA Tour singles title since 2017, and third overall.

Doubles 

  Laura Siegemund /  Vera Zvonareva def.  Alicia Barnett /  Olivia Nicholls 7–5, 6–1

Singles main draw entrants

Seeds 

1 Rankings as of 21 February 2022.

Other entrants 
The following players received wildcards into the singles main draw: 
  Elsa Jacquemot
  Dayana Yastremska
  Vera Zvonareva

The following players received entry using a protected ranking into the singles main draw:
  Elisabetta Cocciaretto
  Vitalia Diatchenko

The following players received entry from the qualifying draw:
  Mariam Bolkvadze 
  Katie Boulter 
  Cristina Bucșa
  Tamara Korpatsch 
  Yuriko Miyazaki
  Stefanie Vögele

The following player received entry as a lucky loser:
  Mai Hontama

Withdrawals
Before the tournament
  Ekaterina Alexandrova → replaced by  Kristina Mladenovic
  Irina-Camelia Begu → replaced by  Irina Bara
  Jaqueline Cristian → replaced by  Ana Bogdan
  Tereza Martincová → replaced by  Vitalia Diatchenko
  Markéta Vondroušová → replaced by  Martina Trevisan
  Maryna Zanevska → replaced by  Mai Hontama

Doubles main draw entrants

Seeds 

 Rankings as of February 21, 2022.

Other entrants 
The following pairs received wildcards into the doubles main draw:
  Elsa Jacquemot /  Tatjana Maria
  Dayana Yastremska /  Ivanna Yastremska

Withdrawals 
Before the tournament
  Tímea Babos /  Chan Hao-ching → replaced by  Georgina García Pérez /  Xenia Knoll
  Anna Blinkova /  Ulrikke Eikeri → replaced by  Ulrikke Eikeri /  Samantha Murray Sharan
  Vivian Heisen /  Julia Lohoff → replaced by  Chan Hao-ching /  Julia Lohoff
  Sania Mirza /  Zhang Shuai → replaced by  Estelle Cascino /  Jessika Ponchet
  Samantha Murray Sharan /  Bibiane Schoofs → replaced by  Alicia Barnett /  Olivia Nicholls

References

External links 
 Official website

2022 in French tennis
2022 WTA Tour
2022 WTA Lyon Open
2022
February 2022 sports events in France
March 2022 sports events in France